Dr.Nalli Kuppuswami Vivekananda Vidyalaya Junior College is a Junior College in Korattur, a part of the Chennai suburban area. It is affiliated to the Central Board of Secondary Education and a unit of the Vivekananda Educational Society, a non-profit, service organisation, which is part of the Vidya Bharati Akhil Bharatiya Shiksha Sansthan. The society runs 21 schools with about 450 teachers and about 15,000 students. The school is led by Principal Smt.J. Jayasri.

History
The school was established in 1978, as a facility which had classes up to V standard, affiliation to the CBSE was granted in 1983, gradually the school grew and the first batch of class -X students passed out in 1987. Later the school was upgraded as Junior College in 1990 and first batch class-XII students passed out in 1992. 

The school provides education for the students around Korattur. Started with 320 students in 1978, it now has 2310 students in the academic year 2012–2013.

References

External links

High schools and secondary schools in Tamil Nadu
Schools in Chennai
Education in Tiruvallur district
Educational institutions established in 1978
1978 establishments in Tamil Nadu